McCarter Theatre Center is a not-for-profit, professional company on the campus of Princeton University in Princeton, New Jersey. The institution is currently led by Artistic Director Sarah Rasmussen and Managing Director Michael S. Rosenberg.

History
Built as a permanent home for the Princeton University Triangle Club (who continue to perform at McCarter) with funds from Thomas N. McCarter, class of 1888, McCarter Theatre opened on February 21, 1930, with a special performance of the 40th annual Triangle show, The Golden Dog. One of its stars was Joshua Logan, a junior, and a sophomore named James Stewart was in the chorus.

During the 1930s, McCarter gained popularity as a pre-Broadway showcase, due to its large seating capacity, its 40-foot proscenium stage, and its short distance from New York. Thornton Wilder's Our Town had its world premiere at McCarter, as did George S. Kaufman and Moss Hart's You Can't Take It with You, James Thurber and Elliott Nugent's The Male Animal (starring Gene Tierney), Philip Barry's Without Love (starring Katharine Hepburn) and William Inge's Bus Stop (starring Kim Stanley and Elaine Stritch).

Although not built as a concert hall, McCarter played host for almost a half-century to the Princeton University Concerts before they moved to Richardson Auditorium. The first major, non-campus-related program of "classical music"  was the Philadelphia Orchestra in March, 1932, to be followed by the Cleveland Orchestra, the New York Philharmonic, Rudolf Serkin, Jascha Heifetz, Myra Hess, Robert and Gaby Casadesus, Zino Francescatti, and Gregor Piatigorsky.

The first dancer was Ruth St. Denis, who appeared in a solo evening on March 7, 1930, and returned that same fall with Ted Shawn and the full troupe of the pioneering Denishawn dancers. But the next several decades saw few dance offerings of any significance, with perhaps one notable exception: a single performance in 1935 by a company of dancers touring under the name of "American Ballet" – the first troupe of dancers assembled in this country by an émigré Russian choreographer named George Balanchine, and as such the early precursor of what would eventually evolve into what we know today as the New York City Ballet.

In the post World War II years, Broadway producers cut costs by having extended preview periods in New York City rather than out-of-town try outs. Thus, the number of touring Broadway shows declined. With increasing debt, the Theatre could no longer be self-supporting, and in 1950 Princeton University and the Triangle Club agreed that the university should take title to the building and assume responsibility for its operating costs. In the late 1950s, Princeton University appointed a faculty advisory committee to determine the best use of the building.

Noted director Milton Lyon was hired in 1960 as consultant to the faculty advisory committee and in time was appointed the first executive producer of the McCarter Theatre Company.

Lyon proposed to the university that McCarter become a "producing" rather than a "booking" theater. His plans included the formation of a company to perform plays, thus establishing the first resident professional theater in America on a university campus. He instantly formed such a company by hiring APA (Association of Performing Artists) for the inaugural theater season, 1960–1961. Under the artistic direction of Ellis Rabb, actors in the APA company included Rosemary Harris, Donald Moffat, Frances Sternhagen, and Edward Asner.

In 1973, Princeton University transferred its direct operation of McCarter to the McCarter Theatre Company, which was separately incorporated at that time. McCarter flourished as a producing theater under Milton Lyon and his successors – most notably Arthur Lithgow, Michael Kahn, Nagle Jackson, and the Theatre's artistic director, Emily Mann – while continuing to present a wide range of dance and classical music concerts.

Emily Mann’s tenure as artistic director was notable for its emphasis on the creation and development of new work, marked especially by an ongoing program of commissions and the fostering of long-term relationships with playwrights both established and emerging, including Athol Fugard.  McCarter commissioned the production and premiered the performance of Vanya and Sonia and Masha and Spike by Christopher Durang, which went on to win the 2013 Tony Award for Best Play.

In 1990s McCarter underwent major renovations and expansions including construction of a smaller second theater adjacent to the main auditorium (the Roger S. Berlind Theater, named for the Princeton graduate and producer), allowing two productions to be mounted simultaneously. 2000 saw the premiere of the first major revival of David Mamet's Glengarry Glen Ross.

Theater series
Under Artistic Director Emily Mann, noteworthy productions include the premieres of new plays by Athol Fugard, Edward Albee, Nilo Cruz, Christopher Durang, Regina Taylor, Beth Henley, Dael Orlandersmith, Steven Dietz, Marina Carr, John Henry Redwood, Eric Bogosian, Theresa Rebeck and Emily Mann.  Many, including Having Our Say, Anna in the Tropics, Crowns, Valley Song and Yellowman, have gone on to be some of the most frequently produced plays in the American theater.  In addition, McCarter is recognized for its re-investigations of the classic canon, including Stephen Wadsworth’s adaptations of plays by Marivaux, David Leveaux’s production of Electra, featuring Zoë Wanamaker, and Emily Mann's adaptations of Anton Chekhov’s The Cherry Orchard and Uncle Vanya.

The theater series also hosts touring shows that fit into the commitment of the theater, such as Mary Zimmerman's The Odyssey. Two of its 2006–2007 productions, Translations and Radio Golf moved to Broadway, where they were nominated for Tony Awards.

References

External links

 McCarter Theatre official website
 
 Firestone Library exhibition marks 75th anniversary of McCarter Theatre
 McCarter Theatre production materials, 1994-2007, held by the Billy Rose Theatre Division, New York Public Library for the Performing Arts

Theatres completed in 1930
1930 establishments in New Jersey
League of Resident Theatres
Princeton University buildings
Regional theatre in the United States
Tony Award winners
Non-profit organizations based in Princeton, New Jersey
Theatres in New Jersey
Theatre companies in New Jersey
Tourist attractions in Mercer County, New Jersey